Left for Dead is a 2007 American-Argentine horror Western film directed by Albert Pyun and starring Victoria Maurette.

Plot synopsis 
In Mexico in 1895, Clementine Templeton is obsessively tracking the wanted man known as Sentenza for deserting her and their infant child. In her travels, she happens upon a gang of former prostitutes led by Mary Black, whose young daughter was also impregnated and abandoned by Sentenza.

They eventually locate their prey and corner him in a remote ghost town called Amnesty. Which is haunted by the vengeful ghost of slain preacher Mobius Lockhardt, who has made a pact with the devil to remain as an earthbound spirit unable to travel beyond the borders of the town's cemetery and slaughtering any who trespasses.

But there are many secrets surrounding the group and the town of Amnesty, and not everyone's motives are what they appear to be on the surface. As bloody betrayals and misdeeds come back to haunt them, they must confront their pasts if they hope to escape Amnesty and the vengeful wrath of Mobius Lockhardt alive.

Cast
 Victoria Maurette as Clementine Templeton  
 María Alche as Dora
 Soledad Arocena as Cota  
 Andres Bagg as Mobius Lockhardt  
 Janet Barr as Mary Black 
 Javier De la Vega as Blake  
 Adnen Helali as Garrett Flaherty  
 Oliver Kolker as Frankie Flaherty  
 Brad Krupsaw as Conner Flaherty  
 Mariana Seligmann as Michelle Black

Production 
The film was shot in 12 days, entirely in Argentina.

Awards 
 2007 – Best Director (Albert Pyun) – Estepona XIII. Costa del Sol Fantasy Film Festival
 2007 – Best Actress (Victoria Maurette) – Buenos Aires Rojo Sangre Film Festival

References

External links 
 
 

2007 films
2007 horror films
2000s Western (genre) horror films
2000s ghost films
American Western (genre) horror films
Argentine Western (genre) horror films
Films set in 1895
Films set in Mexico
Films set in ghost towns
Films shot in Argentina
2000s English-language films
2000s American films
2000s Argentine films